Honoré II (24 December 1597 – 10 January 1662) was Prince of Monaco from 1604 to 1662. He was the first to be called Prince (in 1612), but started his reign as Lord of Monaco.

Early life
Honoré II was born on 24 December 1597. He was the son of Hercule, Lord of Monaco (24 September 1562 – 21 November 1604) and Maria Landi. His father was murdered when he was six, and he succeeded under the regency of his uncle, Frederico Landi, 4th Prince of Val di Taro. Landi was a loyal ally and friend of Spain and allowed the country to be occupied by Spanish troops in 1605. The inhabitants of Monaco were prohibited to carry arms and the Prince and his two sisters were moved to Milan. The Council of Monaco tried to limit Spanish power but the occupation lasted until 1614, and a strong Spanish influence remained until 1633, when it recognized Honoré as a sovereign prince.

Adulthood
From adulthood, Honoré started to criticize Spain and turned to France for support. Louis XIII gave him the support he needed and this resulted in the Treaty of Péronne. This ended Spanish rule and put Monaco under French protection, recognizing and guaranteeing Monegasque sovereignty. As a consequence Honoré lost his Spanish and Italian possessions, but was compensated by King Louis XIII of France with the marquisate Les Baux and the title of Duke of Valentinois.

During his reign he did much to extend, rebuild and transform the Genoese fortress that was the Grimaldi's stronghold into what is today Monaco's Princely Palace.

Marriage and family
On 13 February 1616 he married Ippolita Trivulzio (d. 1638). The couple had one son.
 Ercole Grimaldi, Marquis of Baux (1623 – 2 August 1651); married on 4 July 1641 to Maria Aurelia Spinola (d. 29 September 1670)
Louis (25 July 1642 – 3 January 1701)
Marie Hippolyte (8 May 1644 – 8 October 1694)
Jeanne Marie (b. 4 June 1645)
Thérèse Marie (4 September 1648 – 20 July 1723) ancestress of Maria Teresa Cybo-Malaspina

After Hercules (Ercole) was killed in battle, Louis became Honoré's heir at the age of 9.

Death and legacy
Honoré died on 10 January 1662. He was interred in the Cathedral of St. Nicholas (it stood on the location of the current cathedral) in Monaco.

A collector's silver coin has been issued by the Treasury of Monaco portraying Honoré II on the occasion of the 400th anniversary (1612 – 2012) of the use of the title "Sovereign Prince." The silver coin has a €10 face value.

Ancestors

1597 births
1662 deaths
17th-century Lords of Monaco
17th-century Princes of Monaco
House of Grimaldi
Princes of Monaco
Dukes of Valentinois
Peers created by Louis XIII
Knights of the Golden Fleece
Modern child monarchs
Burials at the Cathedral of Our Lady Immaculate
Monegasque princes
People from Campagna